The City of South Perth is a local government area in Perth, Western Australia. It was established on 9 June 1892 as the South Perth Road District, with a chairman as the leader of the road board. In February 1902, it became the Municipality of South Perth, with a mayor as the leader of its municipal council. It changed back to the South Perth Road District in March 1922, and then changed back to the Municipality of South Perth in February 1956. It became the City of South Perth in June 1959, still with a mayor as the leader of the city council.

South Perth Road Board (1892–1902)

Municipality of South Perth (1902–1922)

South Perth Road Board (1922–1956)

Municipality of South Perth (1956–1959)

City of South Perth

References 

Lists of local government leaders in Western Australia
City of South Perth